James Murphy (born 30 November 1995) is a South African rugby sevens player for the South Africa national rugby sevens team.

Murphy made his debut at the 2018 Hong Kong Sevens, where South Africa placed third. He was a part of the winning squad in the 2019 Singapore Sevens. He also formed part of the 2018/19 team that won the HSBC 7s World Series. 

Murphy was selected to represent South Africa at the 2022 Rugby World Cup Sevens in Cape Town.

References

External links
 

1995 births
Living people
South African rugby union players
South Africa international rugby sevens players
Rugby sevens players at the 2022 Commonwealth Games
Commonwealth Games gold medallists for South Africa
Commonwealth Games medallists in rugby sevens
Medallists at the 2022 Commonwealth Games